Higher Ground Hurricane Relief Benefit Concert [LIVE] is an album with 77 minutes of highlights, from the roughly five-hour long Higher Ground Hurricane Relief Benefit Concert that took place in the Rose Hall Theatre at Jazz at Lincoln Center on September 17, 2005.

All net profits from the sale of the CD will be donated to the Higher Ground Relief Fund  established by Jazz at Lincoln Center and administered through the Baton Rouge Area Foundation to benefit the musicians, music industry related enterprises and other individuals and entities from the areas in Greater New Orleans who were impacted by Hurricane Katrina and to provide other general hurricane relief.

Track listing
"This Joy" – 2:52 - Shirley Caesar  
"Over There" – 7:31 - Terence Blanchard 
"Go to the Mardi Gras" – 5:08 - Art Neville & Aaron Neville  
"Basin Street Blues" – 5:52 - Diana Krall
"Never Die Young" – 4:06 - James Taylor
"The House I Live In" – 5:00 - Dianne Reeves 
"New Orleans Blues" – 4:58 - Marcus Roberts
"I Think It's Going to Rain Today" – 3:04 - Norah Jones  
"Dippermouth Blues" – 2:19 - Wynton Marsalis Hot Seven  
"I'm Gonna Love You Anyway" – 4:50 - Buckwheat Zydeco 
"Is That All There Is" – 4:12 - Bette Midler & Lincoln Center Jazz Orchestra  
"Just a Closer Walk With Thee" – 6:40 - Irvin Mayfield Jr. 
"Here's to Life" – 6:21 - The Jordan Family
"Blackwell's Message" – 5:29 - Joe Lovano 
"Come Sunday" – 9:28 - Cassandra Wilson & Lincoln Center Jazz Orchestra

External links
Album information at jazzatlincolncenter.org

2005 compilation albums
Hurricane Katrina disaster relief charity albums
2005 live albums
Live jazz albums
Blue Note Records live albums
Albums recorded at the Lincoln Center for the Performing Arts